The Annville Institute in Annville, Kentucky was listed on the National Register of Historic Places in 2012.

It was an Appalachian settlement school.

Its campus has been redeveloped and houses a number of non-profits.

References

Settlement schools
National Register of Historic Places in Jackson County, Kentucky
Schools in Jackson County, Kentucky
School buildings on the National Register of Historic Places in Kentucky